Steve Strongman is a Canadian blues guitarist, singer and songwriter.  He has released several full length blues albums, Honey, Blues in Colour, Live at the Barn A Natural Fact,  Let Me Prove it to You and No Time Like Now.

Career

Strongman originally from Kitchener, Ontario started playing guitar at age 16. He studied under blues veteran Mel Brown, later playing country, rock, and pop. He has performed with Canadian musicians Roy Clark, Jeff Healey, and Tal Bachman. He subsequently formed Plasticine with co-frontman Rob Szabo. Their video "No One" received extensive play on Much Music. They released two albums, 1999's self-titled CD and 2001's Public Address System. They appeared on national television on Open Mike with Mike Bullard, but folded shortly after when their label collapsed. Following the band's demise, Strongman opted to be the lead guitar player for Kazzer, giving him the opportunity to tour in the United States and Europe.

Strongman relocated to Hamilton, Ontario in 2007 releasing Honey, his first blues album.  The album, consisted of eleven tracks including nine originals, earned good reviews and earned him a Maple Blues Award nomination as well as four nominations at the 2007 Hamilton Music Awards. He toured with his band playing blues clubs across the country, with stops at the Montreal Jazz Festival, the Ottawa Blues Festival and the Tremblant International Blues Festival. He opened for Buddy Guy in Hamilton in 2008. He also supported well-known slide guitar player Sonny Landreth on his only Canadian date in Toronto, Ontario.

Awards and recognitions
 2019 International Blues Challenge Winner, Best Guitarist, Solo/Duo
 2018 Juno Award Nominee, Blues Recording of the Year, No Time Like Now
 2015 Juno Award Nominee, Blues Recording of the Year, Let Me Prove It To You
 2013 Juno Award Winner, Blues Recording of the Year, A Natural Fact
 2012 Maple Blues Award, Recording of the Year, A Natural Fact
 2012 Maple Blues Award, Songwriter of the Year
 2012 Maple Blues Award, Guitarist of the Year 
 2011 Maple Blues Award, Guitarist of the Year
 2009 Mel Brown Blues Award
 2009 Hamilton Music Award, Blues Album of the Year, Blues in Colour

Discography
 2019 Tired of Talkin’
 2017 No Time Like Now
 2014 Let me Prove It Too You
 2012 A Natural Fact
 2010 Live at the Barn
 2009 Blues in Colour
 2007 Honey

Audio visual
 2010 Live at the Barn

References

External links
Steve Strongman Website
Facebook – Steve Strongman Music 

Living people
Canadian blues guitarists
Male guitarists
Canadian male singer-songwriters
Canadian singer-songwriters
Musicians from Kitchener, Ontario
Juno Award for Blues Album of the Year winners
Year of birth missing (living people)